This is a list of pseudo-German words adapted from the German language in such a way that their meanings in English are not readily understood by native speakers of German (usually because of the new circumstances in which these words are used in English).

blitz or "the Blitz" (chiefly British use) – The sustained attack by the German Luftwaffe during 1940–1941, which began after the Battle of Britain. It was adapted from "Blitzkrieg" (lightning war). The word "Blitz" (a bolt of lightning) was not used in German in its aerial-war aspect; it acquired an entirely new usage in English during World War II.
In British English, blitz is also used as a verb in a culinary context, to mean liquidise in a blender, a food processor or with a handheld blender stick. 
In American football, a blitz occurs when some defensive players (other than those on the defensive line) abandon their normal positions, attack the offensive backfield, and try to overwhelm the offensive blockers before the quarterback or ball carrier can react. A blitz could cause a loss of yards, a sack, a risky throw, an incompletion, a fumble, or an interception. Because it can leave the defensive structure undermanned, a blitz is a high-risk, high-reward defensive strategy that can be used against either the passing game or the running game.
hock (British only) – A German white wine. The word is derived from Hochheim am Main, a town in Germany.
Mox nix! – From the German phrase, "" Often used by U.S. servicemen to mean "It doesn't matter" or "It's not important".
strafe – In its sense of "to machine-gun troop assemblies and columns from the air", strafe is an adaptation of the German word strafen (punish).

See also
Linguistic purism in English
List of German expressions in English
Pseudo-anglicism

References

German
English Pseudo